Neil Andrew Campbell (26 January 1977 – 30 April 2022) was an English footballer who played in the Football League for York City, Scarborough and Southend United.

Death 
Campbell died on 30 April 2022 at the age of 45. He had been out to dinner in Yarm when an ambulance was called for him after complaints of feeling unwell.

Honours
Leigh RMI
Lancashire FA Challenge Trophy: 2002−03

References

External links

1977 births
2022 deaths
Footballers from Middlesbrough
English footballers
Association football forwards
York City F.C. players
Scarborough F.C. players
Telford United F.C. players
Southend United F.C. players
Doncaster Rovers F.C. players
Leigh Genesis F.C. players
Barrow A.F.C. players
English Football League players